Ashotan II (Ashot'an II Mukhranbatoni; died 1697) was a Georgian tavadi ("prince") of the House of Mukhrani, a collateral branch of the royal Bagrationi dynasty of Kartli. He was Prince (batoni) of Mukhrani and ex officio commander of the Banner of Shida Kartli from 1688 to 1692. 

Prince Ashotan was son of Kaikhosro (or of Constantine I, according to the genealogist Cyril Toumanoff). Ashotan was allied with his relative, King George XI of Kartli, who was deposed by the Safavid shah of Iran Suleiman I in 1688. The rival Georgian royal, Heraclius I, of the Kakhetian Bagrationi, acceded to the throne of Kartli and began demoting the associates of George XI. The leading nobles of Kartli, Ashotan of Mukhrani included, lost their fiefs and privileges.

Ashotan was married to a certain Anna and had three children:

 Prince Iese (died 1716), Prince of Mukhrani (1700);
 Prince Kaikhosro (fl. 1672 – 1700);
 Princess Tinarin (fl. 1700 – 1712).

References 

1697 deaths
House of Mukhrani
Year of birth unknown
17th-century people from Georgia (country)